Boken is a village and union council of Jhelum District in the Punjab Province of Pakistan. It is part of Jhelum Tehsil. Its population is about 17171.

References

Populated places in Tehsil Jhelum
Union councils of Jhelum Tehsil